Albert George Eckert (May 17, 1906 – April 20, 1974), nicknamed "Obbie", was a Major League Baseball pitcher. He first played with the Cincinnati Reds in 1930 and 1931. Later in his career, he would play with the St. Louis Cardinals in 1935.

References

External links

Baseball players from Milwaukee
Cincinnati Reds players
St. Louis Cardinals players
Major League Baseball pitchers
1906 births
1974 deaths